Roorkee Cantonment is a cantonment town, in Roorkee, Haridwar district in the Indian state of Uttarakhand, and is one of country's oldest cantonments established in 1853, and the headquarters of Bengal Engineer Group (Bengal Sappers) since 1853.

History

Roorkee became home to the Bengal Sappers and Miners in 1853, and two artillery units were stationed here. Today, the cantonment has a large army base with headquarters for 'Bengal Engineer Group' (BEG), also known as Bengal Sappers, established in 1803, in 1901 the population of the cantonment had grown to 2951.

Demographics
 India census, Roorkee Cantonment had a population of 17,747. Males constitute 61% of the population and females 39%. Roorkee has an average literacy rate of 87%, higher than the national average of 59.5%: male literacy is 92%, and female literacy is 76%. In Roorkee, 10% of the population is under 6 years of age.

References

External links
 Roorkee City Official website
 The Bengal Snappers - Roorkee, Official website
 Roorkee, Cantonment Board, Official website
 Roorkee Cantonment at wikimapia

Cities and towns in Haridwar district
Cantonments of British India
Cantonments of India
1853 establishments in India
Roorkee